Best in TV: The Greatest TV Shows of Our Time is a television countdown special that aired on September 18, 2012, as a special edition of 20/20 hosted by Barbara Walters. The special presented the results of nine categories from a poll conducted by ABC News and People magazine to determine what America thought were the best television shows of all time.

Countdown Results

Best TV Dad
Walters revealed the results of this category on Good Morning America.

 Cliff Huxtable - The Cosby Show
 Andy Taylor - The Andy Griffith Show
 Howard Cunningham - Happy Days
 Al Bundy - Married...with Children
 Dan Conner - Roseanne

Best TV Comedy

 I Love Lucy
 Seinfeld
 M*A*S*H
 The Cosby Show
 All in the Family

Best TV Mom

 Clair Huxtable – The Cosby Show
 Carol Brady – The Brady Bunch
 Marie Barone – Everybody Loves Raymond
 Marion Cunningham – Happy Days
 June Cleaver – Leave It to Beaver

Best TV Drama

 ER
 The Twilight Zone
 The Sopranos
 The West Wing
 Mad Men

Best Non-Human Character

 Kermit the Frog – The Muppet Show
 Lassie – Lassie
 Mr. Spock – Star Trek
 ALF – ALF
 Miss Piggy – The Muppet Show

Best TV Host

 Johnny Carson – The Tonight Show Starring Johnny Carson
 Ellen DeGeneres – The Ellen DeGeneres Show
 Oprah Winfrey – The Oprah Winfrey Show
 Carol Burnett – The Carol Burnett Show
 David Letterman – Late Show with David Letterman

Best Reality Show

 Dancing with the Stars
 American Idol
 Survivor
 The Amazing Race
 The Deadliest Catch

Best Variety Show

 Saturday Night Live
 The Carol Burnett Show
 In Living Color
 American Bandstand
 The Ed Sullivan Show

Best Cop or Legal Show

 Law & Order: Special Victims Unit
 Law & Order
 Columbo
 24
 Hill Street Blues

Best TV Show
 I Love Lucy
 M*A*S*H
 Seinfeld
 All in the Family
 Cheers

Online Results

Best TV Theme Song
 "I'll Be There For You" from Friends
 "Where Everybody Knows Your Name" from Cheers
 "The Ballad of Gilligan's Isle" from Gilligan's Island
 Theme from The Addams Family
 Theme from Mission: Impossible

Best Game Show
 Jeopardy!
 The Price Is Right
 Wheel of Fortune
 Hollywood Squares
 Family Feud

Most Memorable Televised Moment
 The 9/11 attacks
 The John F. Kennedy assassination
 The Apollo 11 moon landing
 The First inauguration of Barack Obama
 The Challenger explosion

Best Animated Series
 The Flintstones
 The Simpsons
 Looney Tunes
 Peanuts
 Scooby-Doo, Where Are You!

Best Soap Opera
 General Hospital
 All My Children
 Days of Our Lives
 The Young and the Restless
 Dark Shadows

See also
 Best in Film: The Greatest Movies of Our Time

References

External links
 ABC News - Best in Television
 

American Broadcasting Company original programming
Top television lists